Sheung is a Cantonese romanization of the Chinese surnames  (Cháng) and  (Shāng).

It's a very uncommon surname in the United States, with fewer than 100 people sharing it during the year 2000 US Census.

List of persons with the surname
商
 Kiki Sheung, a Hong Kong actress

See also
 Chang (surname), for more about that surname in mainland China and on Taiwan
 Shang (surname), for more about that surname in mainland China and on Taiwan

References

Chinese-language surnames
Cantonese-language surnames
Multiple Chinese surnames